Russia has participated in 4 FIFA World Cups since its independence in December 1991. The Russian Federation played their first international match against Mexico on 16 August 1992, winning 2–0. Their first participation in a World Cup was in the United States in 1994 where they achieved 18th place.

In 1946, the Soviet Union was accepted by FIFA and entered their first World Cup in Sweden 1958. The Soviet Union national football team played in 7 World Cups. Their best performance was reaching fourth place in England 1966. The USSR was dissolved in 1991 when Belarus, Russia and Ukraine declared independence under the Belavezha Accords, along with Georgia. The CIS national football team (Commonwealth of Independent States) was formed with other independent nations in 1992 for the purpose of competing in UEFA Euro 1992. Russia was recognized as the official successor of the Soviet Union by FIFA and inherited the records of the Soviet Union.

Russia most recently qualified for the 2018 edition as hosts. They were banned from the 2022 edition during qualification. The last time Russia failed to qualify after a full qualification round was in 2010.

Overview

History
 Champions   Runners-up   Third place   Fourth place  

*Draws include knockout matches decided via penalty shoot-out

Record vs

As Soviet Union

As Russia

Last update 8 July 2018

Soviet Union in Sweden 1958

Group play-off

Quarter-final

Soviet Union in Chile 1962

Quarter-final

Soviet Union in England 1966

Quarter-final

Semi-final

Bronze Final

Soviet Union in Mexico 1970

Quarter-final

Soviet Union in Spain 1982

Second round Group A

Soviet Union in Mexico 1986

Round of 16

Soviet Union in Italy 1990

Russia in USA 1994

Russia in South Korea/Japan 2002

Russia in Brazil 2014

Russia vs South Korea
This was the first time the two countries have played each other in the FIFA World Cup, though they did play a friendly in 2013, which Russia won 2–1. The match ended in a 1–1 draw, with both goals being in the second half.

Belgium vs Russia

Algeria vs Russia

Russia in Russia 2018

Knockout stage 
Round of sixteen

Quarter-finals

Record players
Russia's record World Cup player is Dynamo Moscow legend Lev Yashin. The 1958 FIFA World Cup in particular, which was the first one to be widely broadcast on television, had a major part in introducing Yashin's active and demanding goalkeeping style to the world at large. FIFA have established him as the best goalkeeper of the 20th century by repeatedly naming him in all-star teams like the FIFA World Cup Dream Team in 2002.

Top goalscorers
Russia's top goalscorers at the FIFA World Cup, Valentin Ivanov and Oleg Salenko, have won a Golden Boot award each. Salenko is the only player who has ever scored five goals in a single World Cup match, and the only player to win the Golden Boot even though his team was eliminated in the group stage.

References

 Article in EU-Football

 
Russia national football team
Soviet Union national football team
Countries at the FIFA World Cup